George Reynolds (born November 23, 1947) is an American former professional basketball player who played collegiately for Houston before a brief stint in the NBA with the Detroit Pistons.

College career
Reynolds transferred from Imperial Valley, a junior college, to Houston in 1967.

He was part of the 1967–68 Cougars team which downed UCLA (then undefeated for 47 games) in the Game of the Century on 20 January 1968. He scored a team second-best 13 points in the 71-69 upset, also contributing good defending.

He was the starting guard for Houston, the No.1 collegiate team that season, and led the team in assists during the regular season with 157, also scoring 280 points. However, he was ruled ineligible for postseason play in March 1968, a few days before the NCAA tournament, because of insufficient semester hours at Imperial Valley.
Houston would lose 69-101 to UCLA in the tournament semi-finals, with team mate Don Chaney crediting Reynolds' absence as decisive.
He again led Houston in assists during the 1968-69 season, also contributing 13 points per game in his senior year.

Professional career
He was drafted in the ninth round (117th pick overall) of the 1969 NBA draft by the Detroit Pistons, he signed with the team in June of that year. He played only 10 games for the Pistons (averaging 2.1 points and 1.2 assists) during the 1969–70 NBA season before being waived in mid-December 

He played for the Swiss Alpines of the European Professional Basketball League during the league's only season in early 1975.

References

External links
College Statistics at Sports Reference

1947 births
Living people
American expatriate basketball people in Switzerland
American men's basketball players
Detroit Pistons draft picks
Detroit Pistons players
Houston Cougars men's basketball players
Junior college men's basketball players in the United States
Point guards